Andrew Bailey is an American attorney and politician who was appointed to serve as the Missouri Attorney General in November 2022.

Education 
Bailey earned a Bachelor of Arts degree in English from the University of Missouri and a Juris Doctor from the University of Missouri School of Law.

Career 
After earning his bachelor's degree, Bailey joined the United States Army as an officer. During his military career, he was deployed to Iraq. After graduating from law school, Bailey served as an assistant prosecuting attorney in the Warren County Prosecuting Attorney's Office and as general counsel of the Missouri Department of Corrections. Bailey joined the office of Governor Mike Parson as deputy general counsel in 2019 and became general counsel in 2021. In November 2022, Governor Parson appointed Bailey as the 44th attorney general of Missouri. He is a Republican candidate for a full term in the 2024 Missouri Attorney General election.

On March 7, 2023, federal Brian C. Wimes found a state law, signed by  Parson, regulating cooperation with federal authorities on firearms issues, to be unconstitutional as a violation of the Supremacy Clause. Bailey said he would challenge the decision and Republican congressman Eric Burlison denigrated the decision as being understandable supposedly because Wimes was an appointee of President Barack Obama. Disappointed with Bailey's action, Kansas City Mayor Quinton Lucas said that Missouri officials had hoped, comparing Bailey to former A.G., now-U.S. Senator, Eric Schmitt, that Bailey "...would approach the office like a grown-up."

References 

Living people
Missouri Attorneys General
Missouri lawyers
Missouri Republicans
University of Missouri School of Law alumni
Year of birth missing (living people)